Kabelo Secondary School (formerly known as Kabelo Combined School), is a public school (no fee school) situated in Polokwane Ext 44 in the Limpopo province of South Africa.
 
The school offers Science classes, Commerce, Tourism and History classes respectively in FET phase.

History 
The Gender-neutral public school was founded in 2004 at Greenside Ext 44, Polokwane. The school was initially a combined school comprising both high school and primary school before it was split into two in 2009.

Before the school was built, classes were attended in immobilised buses for quite some time, years later the school suffered with furniture.

The school is also known locally for its criminal activities that have occurred throughout its existence.

Academics

Notable alumni

Notes 

Schools in Limpopo
Educational institutions established in 2004
2004 establishments in South Africa
Schools in South Africa